Mario Alberto Ettore Monicelli (16 May 1915 – 29 November 2010) was an Italian film director and screenwriter and one of the masters of the Commedia all'Italiana (Comedy Italian style). He was nominated six times for an Oscar, and was awarded the Golden Lion for his career.

Biography

The early times 
Monicelli was born in Rome to a well-do family from Ostiglia, a comune in the province of Mantua, in the Northern Italian region of Lombardy, as the second of five children of Tomaso Monicelli, a journalist, and Maria Carreri, a housewife. His older half-brother, Giorgio (whose mother was actress Elisa Severi), worked as writer and translator. An older brother, Franco, was a journalist. 

Raised in Rome, Viareggio (Tuscany) and Milan, Monicelli lived a carefree youth, and many of the cinematic jokes he later shot in Amici Miei (My Friends) were inspired by his own experiences during his youth in Tuscany. 

In Milan, he finished his third year of high school and began his university studies. In the Lombard capital, Monicelli met Riccardo Freda, Remo Cantoni, Alberto Lattuada, Alberto Mondadori and Vittorio Sereni; together they founded, with the support of the publisher Mondadori, the newspaper "Camminare", in which Monicelli dealt with film criticism. Monicelli recounted how, in his criticism, he was very critical of Italian films, while, on the other hand, he exalted American and French films, which he loved very much, stating that perhaps he did so out of a veiled form of anti-fascism. "Camminare" did not last long as the Ministry of Popular Culture suppressed it because it was considered left-wing.

Later, Monicelli returned to Tuscany, where he completed his University studies in Pisa, at the Faculty of Literature and Philosophy. Interested in the world of celluloid, he kept on putting off graduating until he was called up for military service. Monicelli said: "it was enough to go to graduation dressed as a soldier and you didn't need a thesis or anything else [...] That's how my degree came about, I don't even know if it's valid". 

In 1934 he shot his "first cinematographic experiment", the short film Cuore rivelatore (Tell-tale Heart), inspired by Edgar Allan Poe's work of the same name, together with Alberto Mondadori and Alberto Lattuada, with the latter acting as set designer as he was an architecture student at the time. The three sent it to a national cultural festival, "Littoriali", hoping in vain that it would be shown, but the film was branded as an example of "paranoid cinema".

Breakthrough 

Always with his friend Alberto Mondadori, he released the silent film I ragazzi della Via Paal (an adaptation of the novel The Paul Street Boys), which was an award-winner in the Venice Film Festival. The award earned Monicelli the opportunity to work in the production of a professional film. He was therefore able to skip the various stages of professional training and was sent, together with Mondadori, to work as a camera assistant in the production of Gustav Machatý's film "Ballerine".

After that he found work, as a camera assistant again, in Augusto Genina's film Lo squadrone bianco and The Castiglioni Brothers by Corrado D'Errico. There he met Giacomo Gentilomo, who hired him as an assistant director and co-writer for Short Circuit, considered as a possible precursor to the giallo genre.

In 1937, under the pseudonym of Michele Badiek, he wrote and directed the amateur film Pioggia d'estate ("Summer Rain") The film was attended by many friends and fellow citizens. Monicelli said that this experience was important for his training as he learned to 

From 1939–42, he produced up to 40 numerous screenplays, and worked as an assistant director.

In 1940 Monicelli enlisted in the cavalry, hoping that this choice could avoid him being sent to Russia or to Africa. When the army broke up in 1943, he fled to Rome, where he remained hidden until the summer of 1944. 

In 1946 his father Tomaso committed suicide. Being a journalist and a literary critic, Tomaso Monicelli had dared to criticise the fascist regime especially after the murder of Giacomo Matteotti in 1924. He was blacklisted and boycotted for his writings and endured a series of failures. Later on, Monicelli said he could understand his father's decision

Comedy Italian Style 

Monicelli made his official debut as a director in 1949 along with Steno, with the film Totò cerca casa starring the comedy genius Totò. From the very beginning of his career Monicelli's cinematic style had a remarkable flow to it. The duo produced eight successful movies in four years, including the cult film Cops and Robbers (1951) and Totò a colori (1952). From 1953 onwards Monicelli worked alone, without leaving his role as a writer of screenplays.

Monicelli's career includes some of the masterpieces of Italian cinema. In I soliti ignoti (Big Deal on Madonna Street) (1958), featuring the ubiquitous comedian Totò in a side role, he discovered the comical talent of Vittorio Gassman and Marcello Mastroianni and probably started the new genre of the modern commedia all'italiana (comedy Italian style). While better known in the English-speaking world under the title Big Deal on Madonna Street, the actual translation from the Italian is "the usual unknown perpetrators" (closely resembling the famous line from Casablanca: "Round up the usual suspects"). The film was nominated for the Best Foreign Language Film at the 31st Academy Awards.

The Great War, released one year later, is generally regarded as one of his most successful works, which rewarded Monicelli with a Golden Lion in the Venice Film Festival, and an Academy Award nomination for the Best Foreign Film. The film featured the famous drama actor Vittorio Gassman, the Italian superstar of comedy, Alberto Sordi, and a star of Italian neorealism Silvana Mangano. It excelled in the absence of rhetorical accents and for its sharp, tragicomical sense of history while portraying the Italian defeat during World War I. 

Among the difficulties encountered in the production of the films, those related to censorship were particularly strong. The film "Totò e Carolina" underwent three revisions, because according to the censors, the mere fact that the policeman was played by Totò was tantamount to pillorying the police.

Monicelli received two more Academy Award nominations with I compagni (The Organizer, 1963), a heart-felt homage to "humanitarian socialism" and The Girl with the Pistol (1968), which tackled the themes of bride kidnapping and honor killing, still relevant in the Southern-Italian culture of the time.

L'armata Brancaleone (For Love and Gold, 1966) is another masterpiece of Italian cinema. The film tells the tragicomic tale of a Middle Ages Italian knight, with uncertain nobility and few means but high ideals, self-confidence and pomposity (Vittorio Gassman). The bizarre Macaronic Latin-Italian dialogues were devised by Age & Scarpelli, the most renowned writers of Italian comedies, and represent a whole linguistic invention which was followed by Brancaleone alle Crociate (Brancaleone at the Crusades) in 1970, and less successfully in Bertoldo, Bertoldino e Cacasenno.

Amici miei (My Friends, 1975), featuring Ugo Tognazzi, Adolfo Celi, Gastone Moschin, Duilio Del Prete and Philippe Noiret, was one of the most successful films in Italy and confirmed Monicelli's genius in mixing humour, irony and bitter understanding of the human condition. The film was popular to the point that some lines are today turned into well established idiomatic expression ("la supercazzola"), and even a programming language ("monicelli") has been created using a syntax based on film quotes. His 1976 film  Caro Michele won him the Silver Bear for Best Director at the 26th Berlin International Film Festival. 

Dramatic accents were predominant in the Un borghese piccolo piccolo (A Very Little Man, 1978), featuring Alberto Sordi for his first complete dramatic role. Here Monicelli's pessimism takes over: the transformation of Italian society was such that it was no longer possible to laugh, believe or hope. This is why it is considered by many critics to be the film that brings the season of Comedy Italian Style to a close.

Final years 

He turned again to more cheerful comedy and attention to historical events from a popular, intimate point of view with Il Marchese del Grillo (1981), also featuring Alberto Sordi at his best. The film was awarded Monicelli's third Silver Bear for Best Director award at the 32nd Berlin International Film Festival. The Rogues (1987) was also a historical parody set during Renaissance.

Among the final works by Monicelli are Let's Hope It's a Girl (1985), Dearest Relatives, Poisonous Relations (1992) and Dear Goddamned Friends (1994), featuring Paolo Hendel. The latter won an Honourable Mention at the 44th Berlin International Film Festival. His 1999 film Dirty Linen was entered into the 21st Moscow International Film Festival. 

His last feature film was The Roses of the Desert (Le rose del deserto, 2006), which he directed when he was 91 years old.

In 1991 he received the Golden Lion for Career of the  Venice Film Festival. A documentary made by Roberto Salinas and Marina Catucci, Una storia da ridere, breve biografia di Mario Monicelli, appeared in 2008.

Death
At the age of 90, Monicelli decided to go and live on his own, in order to remain self-sufficient and survive to ageing for a longer time. 

He died on 29 November 2010 at the age of 95. He killed himself by jumping from a window of the San Giovanni Hospital in Rome, where he had been admitted a few days earlier for prostate cancer in the terminal stage He had two daughters, Martina (1967) and Ottavia (1974), from Antonella Salerni. He had a third daughter, Rosa (1988), from his last companion Chiara Rapaccini.  

He was an outspoken atheist.

Filmography

Director

 I ragazzi della Via Paal, with Alberto Mondadori (1935)
 Pioggia d'estate (1937)
 Toto Looks for a House (with Steno, 1949)
 Al diavolo la celebrità (1949, with Steno)
 Vita da cani (with Steno, 1950)
 The Knight Has Arrived! (with Steno, 1950)
 Guardie e ladri (with Steno, 1951)
 Totò e i re di Roma (with Steno, 1952)
 Totò e le donne (Toto and the Women, 1952, with Steno)
 Le infedeli, with Steno (1953)
 Proibito (1954)
 Un eroe dei nostri tempi (1955)
 Totò e Carolina (1955)
 Donatella (1956)
 Il medico e lo stregone (1957)
 Padri e figli (1957)
 I soliti ignoti (Big Deal on Madonna Street, 1958)
 The Great War (1959)
 The Passionate Thief (1960)
 Boccaccio '70 (1962 – segment "Renzo and Luciana")
 I compagni (The Organizer, 1963)
 Alta infedeltà (High Infidelity, 1964, with Luciano Salce, Elio Petri and Franco Rossi)
 Casanova '70 (1965)
 Le fate (1966 –, with Mauro Bolognini, Antonio Pietrangeli and Luciano Salce )
 L'armata Brancaleone (For Love and Gold, 1966)
 The Girl with the Pistol (1968)
 Capriccio all'italiana (Caprice Italian Style, 1968, with Mauro Bolognini, Steno, Pino Zac, Pier Paolo Pasolini and Franco Rossi)
 Toh, è morta la nonna! (1969)
 Brancaleone alle Crociate (Brancaleone at the Crusades, 1970)
 Le coppie (1971, with Alberto Sordi and Vittorio De Sica)
 La mortadella (1971)
 Vogliamo i colonnelli (1973)
 Romanzo popolare (1974)
 Amici miei (1975)
 Caro Michele (1976)
 Signore e signori, buonanotte (1976, with Luigi Comencini, Nanni Loy, Luigi Magni and Ettore Scola)
 Un borghese piccolo piccolo (1977)
 Viva Italia! (1977, with Dino Risi and Ettore Scola)
 Viaggio con Anita (1979)
 Temporale Rosy (1979)
 Camera d'albergo (1981)
 Il marchese del Grillo (1981)
 Amici miei atto II (1982)
 Bertoldo, Bertoldino e Cacasenno (1984)
 Le due vite di Mattia Pascal (1985)
 Speriamo che sia femmina (1986)
 I picari (1987)
 La moglie ingenua e il marito malato (1989)
 12 registi per 12 città (1989,  documentary. Segment "Verona")
 Il male oscuro (1990)
 Rossini! Rossini! (1991)
 Parenti serpenti (1992)
 Cari fottutissimi amici (1994)
 Facciamo paradiso (1995)
 Esercizi di stile (1996 – segment Idillio edile)
 Topi di appartamento (1997, short)
 Panni sporchi (1999)
 Un amico magico: il maestro Nino Rota (1999, documentary)
 Come quando fuori piove (2000, TV mini series)
 Un altro mondo è possibile (2001, documentary)
 Lettere dalla Palestina (2002, documentary)
 Firenze, il nostro domani (2003, documentary)
 Le rose del deserto (The Roses of the Desert, 2006)

Screenplays

I ragazzi della via Paal (1935)
Pioggia d'estate (1937)
La granduchessa si diverte (1940)
Brivido (1941)
La donna è mobile (1942)
 Short Circuit (1943)
Il sole di Montecassino (1945)
 Black Eagle (1946)
 The Opium Den (1947)
Gioventù perduta (1947)
 The Captain's Daughter (1947)
 The Courier of the King (1947)
Follie per l'opera (1948)
I Miserabili (1948)
L'ebreo errante (1948)
Il cavaliere misterioso (1948)
Accidenti alla guerra! (1948)
Il tradimento (1949)
Al diavolo la celebrità (1949)
Totò cerca casa (1949)
 The Wolf of the Sila (1949)
Il conte Ugolino (1949)
 Her Favourite Husband (1950)
Vita da cani (1950)
Soho Conspiracy (1950)
The Elusive Twelve (1950)
È arrivato il cavaliere! (1950)
Il brigante Musolino (1950)
Botta e risposta (1950)
Guardie e ladri (1951)
Tizio, Caio, Sempronio (1951)
 It's Love That's Ruining Me (1951)
 The Ungrateful Heart (1951)
Accidenti alle tasse!! (1951)
Amo un assassino (1951)
Totò e i re di Roma (1952)
 Sardinian Vendetta (1952)
Totò e le donne (1952)
Totò a colori (1952)
Perdonami (1952)
Cinque poveri in automobile (1952)
 Cats and Dogs (1952)
Un turco napoletano (1953)
Il più comico spettacolo del mondo (1953)
Le infedeli (1953)
 Fatal Desire (1953)
Giuseppe Verdi (1953)
Guai ai vinti (1954)
Proibito (1954)
Un eroe dei nostri tempi (1955)
Totò e Carolina (1955)
La donna più bella del mondo (1955)
Donatella (1956)
Il medico e lo stregone (1957)
Padri e figli (1957)
I soliti ignoti (1958)
The Great War (1959)
Risate di gioia (1960)
A cavallo della tigre (1961)
Boccaccio '70 (1962 – segment "Renzo e Luciana")
Frenesia dell'estate (1963)
I compagni (1963)
Casanova 70 (1965)
I nostri mariti (1966 – segment "Il marito di Olga")
L'armata Brancaleone (1966)
The Girl with the Pistol (1968)
Toh, è morta la nonna! (1969)
Brancaleone alle crociate (1970)
Vogliamo i colonnelli (1973)
Gran bollito (1977)
Amici miei (My Friends, 1975)
Un borghese piccolo piccolo (1977)
Temporale Rosy (1979)
Camera d'albergo (1981)
Il marchese del Grillo (1981)
Amici miei atto II (1982)
Bertoldo, Bertoldino e Cacasenno (1984)
Le due vite di Mattia Pascal (1985)
Speriamo che sia femmina (1986)
I picari (1987)
Il male oscuro (1990)
Rossini! Rossini! (1991)
Parenti serpenti (1992)
Cari fottutissimi amici (1994)
Facciamo paradiso (1995)
Panni sporchi (1999)
Un amico magico: il maestro Nino Rota (1999, documentary)
Come quando fuori piove (2000, TV mini series)
Le rose del deserto (The Roses of the Desert, 2006)

Actor
Rue du Pied de Grue (1979)
Sono fotogenico, directed by Dino Risi (1980)
Il ciclone, directed by Leonardo Pieraccioni (1996, voice)
Sotto il sole della Toscana (Under the Tuscan Sun, 2003)

References

External links

 
 
 Presentation of the documentary Monicelli, Mario’s Version

1915 births
2010 deaths
2010 suicides
Writers from Rome
Film people from Rome
Italian film directors
Italian screenwriters
Italian male screenwriters
Italian atheists
Directors of Golden Lion winners
Silver Bear for Best Director recipients
Italian communists
Suicides by jumping in Italy
David di Donatello winners
David di Donatello Career Award winners
Nastro d'Argento winners
Ciak d'oro winners